Travel Agent is a biweekly trade magazine, published by Questex, LLC and targeted at travel agency professionals, featuring travel industry news. It is based in New York City.

History and profile
The magazine was established in 1930. In 1998 Travel Agent was sold by Universal Media, Inc. to Advanstar Communications Inc. It was formerly published on a twice weekly bases in the 1970s and later on a weekly basis.

Travel Agent targets travel agents, agency owners/managers, and other travel industry staff. The magazine is also supplemented with an online edition. Questex Media also operates Travel Agent University, an on-line travel education site. Sister publications include: Luxury Travel Advisor, Home Based Travel Agent, Official Travel Industry Directory, Hotel & Motel Management, Premier Hotels & Resorts and Premier Spas & Romance.

Travel Agent is the recipient of Folio magazine's editorial excellence award in the travel trade category.

References

External links
  

Business magazines published in the United States
Weekly magazines published in the United States
Biweekly magazines published in the United States
Magazines established in 1930
Magazines published in New York City
Professional and trade magazines
Tourism magazines